Neacomys pictus, also known as the painted neacomys or painted bristly mouse, is a species of rodent in the genus Neacomys of family Cricetidae. It is found only in Panama.

References

Musser, G.G. and Carleton, M.D. 2005. Superfamily Muroidea. Pp. 894–1531 in Wilson, D.E. and Reeder, D.M. (eds.). Mammal Species of the World: a taxonomic and geographic reference. 3rd ed. Baltimore: The Johns Hopkins University Press, 2 vols., 2142 pp. 
Reid, F. and Samudio, R. 2008. . In IUCN. IUCN Red List of Threatened Species. Version 2009.2. <www.iucnredlist.org>. Downloaded on November 25, 2009.

Neacomys
Mammals described in 1912
Taxonomy articles created by Polbot
Taxa named by Edward Alphonso Goldman